Gary Bartz (born September 26, 1940) is an American jazz saxophonist. He has won two Grammy Awards.

Biography

Bartz studied at the Juilliard School. In the early 1960s, he performed with Eric Dolphy and McCoy Tyner in Charles Mingus' Jazz Workshop. He worked as a sideman with Max Roach and Abbey Lincoln before joining Art Blakey and the Jazz Messengers. In 1968, he was a member of McCoy Tyner's band, Expansions.

In mid-1970, he joined Miles Davis' band, performing live at the Isle Of Wight festival in August; and at a series of December dates at The Cellar Door club in Washington, D.C. Portions of these shows were initially released on the 1971 Live-Evil album, with the entire six performance/four night run eventually released in full on the 2005 Cellar Door Sessions box set. He later formed the band Ntu Troop, which combined jazz, funk, and soul.

Bartz was awarded a Grammy for "Best Latin Jazz Performance" for his work on Roy Hargrove's "Habana" at the 40th Annual Grammy Awards, and for "Best Jazz Instrumental Album, Individual or Group" for For McCoy Tyner's Illuminations at the 47th Annual Grammy Awards.

Bartz was awarded the BNY Mellon Jazz 2015 Living Legacy Award, which was presented at a special ceremony at The Kennedy Center.

In 2019, Revive Music and Bartz celebrated the 50th Anniversary of his Another Earth album at Winter Jazzfest in New York City, alongside original member Pharoah Sanders. Later that year, in collaboration with Moon31,

He is Professor of Jazz Saxophone at Oberlin College.

Discography

As leader

As sideman
With Joe Chambers
Urban Groove (441 Records 2003 )

With the Rance Allen Group
 Say My Friend (1977)
With Gene Ammons
Goodbye (Prestige, 1974)
With Roy Ayers
Stoned Soul Picnic (Atlantic, 1968)
With Cindy Blackman
The Oracle (Muse, 1995)
With Art Blakey and the Jazz Messengers
Soul Finger (Limelight, 1965) Bartz recording debut
Hold On, I'm Coming (Limelight, 1966) on one track left over from Soul Finger sessions
With Donald Brown
Sources of Inspiration (Muse, 1989)
With Kenny Burrell
Ellington Is Forever Volume Two (Fantasy, 1975)
With Donald Byrd
 Stepping into Tomorrow (1974)
 Caricatures (1976)
With George Cables
Shared Secrets (MuseFX, 2001)
Looking for the Light (MuseFX, 2003)
With Norman Connors
 Invitation
 Slewfoot
 This is Your Life
 Love from the Sun
 Dance of Magic: Live at the Nemu Jazz Inn
 Romantic Journey
Saturday Night Special
With Miles Davis
 On the Crest of the Airwaves (Discs 1 & 2: Live in August & October 1970)
 The Cellar Door Sessions (1970)
 Live-Evil
 Bitches Brew Live (2011)
 Miles Davis at Newport 1955-1975: The Bootleg Series Vol. 4 (2015)
With Ray Drummond
Vignettes (Arabesque, 1996)
With Antonio Hart
 Don't You Know That I Care (1992)
With Louis Hayes
The Crawl (Candid, 1989)
With Heads of State
 Search for Peace (Smoke Sessions, 2015)
 Four in One (Smoke Sessions, 2017) 
With Phyllis Hyman
 You Know How to Love Me
 Phyllis Hyman
 Can't We Fall in Love Again?
With Barney McAll
 Release the Day (2001)
 Precious Energy (2022)
 Precious Energy Re-UP (2023)
With Jackie McLean
Ode to Super (SteepleChase, 1973) 
With Grachan Moncur III
 Exploration (2004)
With Alphonse Mouzon
 Virtue (1976)
With Rare Silk
 New Weave
With Max Roach
Members, Don't Git Weary (Atlantic, 1968)
With Wallace Roney
A Place in Time (HighNote, 2016)
With Pharoah Sanders
 Deaf Dumb Blind (Summun Bukmun Umyun) (Impulse!, 1970)
With Woody Shaw
Blackstone Legacy (Contemporary, 1970)
For Sure! (Columbia, 1979)
United (Columbia, 1981)
With Sphere
 Sphere (Verve, 1998)

With Charles Tolliver
 Paper Man (Freedom, 1968 [1975])

With Bob Thiele Collective
Lion Hearted (1993)
With Leon Thomas
Precious Energy (Mapleshade Records, 1987)
With Malachi Thompson
Rising Daystar (Delmark, 1999)
Blue Jazz (Delmark, 2003)
With McCoy Tyner
 Expansions (Blue Note, 1968)
 Cosmos (Blue Note, 1970)
 Extensions (Blue Note, 1970)
 Asante (Blue Note, 1970)
 Sama Layuca (Milestone, 1974)
 Focal Point (Milestone, 1976)
 Looking Out (Milestone, 1982)
 Dimensions (Elektra/Musician, 1984)
 McCoy Tyner and the Latin All-Stars (Telarc, 1999)
 Illuminations (Telarc, 2004)

With Robert Walter
 Spirit of '70 (1996)

With Chip White
 Harlem Sunset with Steve Nelson, Robin Eubanks, Claudio Roditi (Postcards)

With John Lee & Gerry Brown
 Infinite Jones  with Chris Hinze (Keytone, 1974)

With The Midnight Hour (with Adrian Younge and Ali Shaheed Muhammed)
 Jazz Is Dead 001, Distant Mode (2020)

References

External links
 MusicWeb Encyclopaedia of Popular Music

1940 births
Living people
Musicians from Baltimore
Baltimore City College alumni
Jazz musicians from Maryland
African-American saxophonists
American jazz alto saxophonists
American jazz soprano saxophonists
American male saxophonists
American jazz clarinetists
American jazz composers
American male jazz composers
Free funk saxophonists
Grammy Award winners
Post-bop saxophonists
SteepleChase Records artists
Atlantic Records artists
Arista Records artists
Capitol Records artists
Vee-Jay Records artists
Candid Records artists
Milestone Records artists
Prestige Records artists
Blue Note Records artists
Jazz alto saxophonists
Jazz soprano saxophonists
21st-century American saxophonists
21st-century clarinetists
21st-century American male musicians
Sphere (American band) members
Mapleshade Records artists
Smoke Sessions Records artists